Euthria is a genus of sea snails, marine gastropod mollusks in the family Buccinidae, the true whelks.

Species
Species within the genus Euthria include:
 
 Euthria abrotona Fraussen & Rolán, 2003
 Euthria adeles Dautzenberg & Fisher, 1906
 † Euthria adunca (Bronn, 1831) 
 Euthria amorimi Fraussen, 2004
 Euthria annegretae Schoenherr & Rolán, 2017
 Euthria aracanense Angas, 1873
 Euthria bernardi Rolán, Monteiro & Fraussen, 2003
 Euthria boavistensis Cosel, 1982
 Euthria calderoni Rolán, 1985
 Euthria calypso Cosel & Burnay, 1983
 † Euthria ceddensis Brunetti & Della Bella, 2016 
 Euthria cesari Monteiro & Rolan, 2005
 Euthria chinense (MacNeil, 1961)
 Euthria cornea (Linnaeus, 1758)
 Euthria cumulata Fraussen & Hadorn, 2003
 † Euthria curvirostris (Grateloup, 1845)
 Euthria darwini Monteiro & Rolan, 2005
 Euthria effendyi Fraussen & Dharma, 2002
 Euthria emilioi Fraussen & Afonso, 2011
 Euthria erythraea Fraussen & Stahlschmidt, 2020
 Euthria fernandesi Rolán, Monteiro & Fraussen, 2003
 Euthria fiadeiroi Fraussen & Swinnen, 2020
 † Euthria friedbergi Baluk, 1995
 † Euthria fuscocingulata (Hoernes & Auinger, 1890)
 Euthria helenae Rolán, Monteiro & Fraussen, 2003
 Euthria inesae Fraussen, Monteiro & Swinnen, 2012 
 Euthria insulabris Fraussen & Rolan, 2003
 † Euthria intermedia Michelotti, 1839
 Euthria japonica (Shuto, 1978)
 Euthria javanica Fraussen & Dekker, 2002
 † Euthria lanotensis Lozouet, 1999 
 Euthria lubrica (Dall, 1918)
 Euthria marianae Rolán, Monteiro & Fraussen, 2003
 † Euthria mellianensis Lozouet, 2021 
 † Euthria minor Bellardi, 1872 
 Euthria noligomesi Rolan & Monteiro, 2007
 † Euthria pangoides (Beu, 1973) 
 † Euthria perpiniana Fontannes, 1879 
 Euthria philpoppei Fraussen, 2002
 Euthria placibilis Fraussen, Monteiro & Swinnen, 2012
 † Euthria plioelongata Sacco, 1890 
 Euthria poppei Fraussen, 1999
 Euthria pulicaria Dautzenberg & Fisher, 1906
 † Euthria puschi Andrzejowski, 1830
 Euthria rolani Cosel, 1982
 Euthria scepta Fraussen & Hadorn, 2003
 Euthria solifer Fraussen & Hadorn, 2003
 Euthria somalica (Parth, 1999)
 Euthria soniae Rolán, Monteiro & Fraussen, 2003
 Euthria taeniopsoides Fraussen & Afonso, 2008
 † Euthria tarusatensis Lozouet, 2021 
 Euthria vandae Rolan & Monteiro, 2007
 † Euthria viciani Kovács, 2018
 Euthria vokesi Fraussen & Garcia, 2008
 Euthria walleri (Ladd, 1976)

Species brought into synonymy
 Euthria aracanense [sic] : synonym of Euthria aracanensis Angas, 1873
 Euthria aucklandica E.A. Smith, 1902: synonym of Xymene aucklandicus (E.A. Smith, 1902)
 Euthria candidata Mabille & Rochebrune: synonym of Pareuthria atrata (E. A. Smith, 1881)
 Euthria cecilea Fraussen & Rolán, 2003: synonym of Euthria marianae Rolán, Monteiro & Fraussen, 2003
 Euthria chlorotica (Martens, 1878): synonym of Pareuthria chlorotica (Martens, 1878)
 Euthria cingulata Reeve L.A., 1847: synonym of Japeuthria cingulata (Reeve, 1846)
 Euthria clathratula Thiele, 1925: synonym of Meteuthria clathratula (Thiele, 1925)
 Euthria eburnea G.B. Sowerby III, 1900 : synonym of Peristernia forskalii leucothea Melvill, 1891
 Euthria fallax Thiele, 1925: synonym of Meteuthria fallax (Thiele, 1925)
 Euthria filmerae G.B. Sowerby III, 1900: synonym of Latirus filmerae (G.B. Sowerby III, 1900)
 Euthria formosa Thiele, 1925: synonym of Meteuthria formosa (Thiele, 1925)
 Euthria fuscata Bruguiere: synonym of Pareuthria fuscata
 Euthria fuscotincta G.B. Sowerby III, 1886: synonym of Peristernia fuscotincta (G.B. Sowerby III, 1886)
 Euthria josepedroi Rolan & Monteiro, 2007: synonym of Euthria vandae Rolán & Monteiro, 2007
 Euthria lacertina Gould, 1860: synonym of Afrocominella capensis capensis (Dunker in Philippi, 1844)
 Euthria multistriata Turton, 1932: synonym of Afrocominella capensis simoniana (Petit de la Saussaye, 1852)
 Euthria ordinaria Turton, 1932: synonym of Peristernia fuscotincta (G.B. Sowerby III, 1886)
 Euthria ponsonbyi G.B. Sowerby, 1889: synonym of Buccinulum ponsonbyi (G.B. Sowerby III, 1889)
 Euthria pura Martens, 1903: synonym of Zemitrella pura (Martens, 1903)
 Euthria queketti E.A. Smith, 1901: synonym of Buccinulum queketti (E.A. Smith, 1901)
 Euthria rikae Fraussen, 2003: synonym of Fusolatirus rikae (Fraussen, 2003)
 Euthria rosea Hombron & Jacquinot, 1853: synonym of Pareuthria powelli
 Euthria saharica Locard, 1897: synonym of Euthriostoma saharicum (Locard, 1897)
 Euthria simoniana Petit, 1852: synonym of Afrocominella capensis simoniana (Petit de la Saussaye, 1852)
 Euthria suduirauti Fraussen, 2003: synonym of Fusolatirus suduirauti (Fraussen, 2003)
 Euthria turtoni Bartsch, 1915: synonym of Afrocominella turtoni (Bartsch, 1915)

References

 Fraussen K. & Swinnen F. (2016). A review of the genus Euthria Gray, 1839 (Gastropoda: Buccinidae) from the Cape Verde archipelago. Xenophora Taxonomy. 11: 9-31.
Fraussen K. & Stahlschmidt P. (2017). Comparing the living eastern Atlantic Euthria Gray, 1839 (Gastropoda: Buccinoidea), with brief remarks on the paleontological and biogeographical context. Gloria Maris 55/3: 70-82.
Bałuk W. (1995). Middle Miocene (Badenian) gastropods from Korytnica, Poland; Part II. Acta Geologica Polonica 45/3-4: 153-255.
Brunetti M. M. & Della Bella G. (2016). Revisioni di alcuni generi della famiglia Buccinidae Rafinesque, 1815 nel Plio-Pleistocene del Bacino Mediterraneo, con descrizione di tre nuove specie. Bollettino Malacologico 52: 3-37.
Landau B. M., Harzhauser M., İslamoğlu Y. & Silva C. M. (2013). Systematics and palaeobiogeography of the gastropods of the middle Miocene (Serravallian) Karaman Basin, Turkey. Cainozoic Research 11-13: 584 pp.
Kovács Z. (2018). New records of the genus Euthria (Mollusca, Buccinidae) in the Miocene Paratethys. Földtani Közlöny 148/2: 179-182. doi: 10.23928/foldt.kozl.2018.148.2.179

Buccinidae
Taxa named by John Edward Gray
Miocene gastropods
Gastropod genera